Waiting for the Rest of It is an EP released by the Goo Goo Dolls in 2010 for Warner Bros. Records. It was made available to all ticket holders for the Something for the Rest of Us Tour, from July 17 onward. The EP was used to promote the Goo Goo Dolls' pending album, Something for the Rest of Us.

Track listing

Sources
 (under home tab, within news feed for July 2010)

2010 EPs
Goo Goo Dolls EPs
Warner Records EPs